Colin McEwan (1941 – 21 August 2005) was an Australian actor, host, comedian and radio announcer. He was best known for appearing on both the stage and TV versions of The Naked Vicar Show, and the sequel on which it was based, opposite Ross Higgins playing Ted Bullpitt's brother Bob Bullpitt in Kingswood Country and also appeared in the miniseries Day of the Roses. He worked as an announcer on Melbourne radio stations 3AK and 3XY, and was a regular guest on TV variety program In Melbourne Tonight.

Biography
McEwan's acting roles included parts in a large number of TV series and mini-series, including the regular roles of Detective Sergeant Dan Cullen in Ryan, Nick in Brass Monkeys, and numerous guest appearances in programs including Homicide, the television adaptation of And The Big Men Fly (1974), The Rise and Fall of Wellington Boots (1975), Cop Shop, Sam's Luck (1980), The Last Bastion (1984), The Boardroom (1988), Jackaroo (1990), and The Gift (1997).

Starting his career in radio in 1957, publicity stated that he was the youngest announcer in Australia at the time. He worked on overnight and breakfast shows.

In 1964, he joined the fledgling ATV-0 as a news reader and general announcer, but soon became the station's "jack of all trades", playing the roles of Gasper Goblin, Cassius Cuckoo and Leonardo da Funbird in ATV-O's popular national 1960s children's TV show Magic Circle Club (1965–67), starring as Ocker Ramsay in the 1967 comedy series Hey You, and appearing in many other ATV-O programs including Off to the Races (1967–69), Fredd Bear's Breakfast-A-Go-Go (1969–72), Musical Cashbox (1969–71, which he also produced for a brief period), and hosting programs including Carosello (1967–68), and 1968s Rendezvous (which he also produced and directed). He also played the roles of Miser Meanie and Gussie Galah in Adventure Island (1967–72), and appeared as a regular on The Ernie Sigley Show (1974–75), and Turpie Tonight (1982–83).

Discography

Albums

Death
He died of cancer after lapsing into a coma at a Gold Coast hospital on 21 August 2005.

References

External links

Hey You at Classic Australian TV
Obituary at The Age

1941 births
2005 deaths
Australian male stage actors
Australian radio personalities
Australian male television actors
Deaths from cancer in Queensland